The following is a list of named professorial positions at Harvard Law School.

James Barr Ames Professor of Law – J. B. Ames was a prominent Law educator who served as the dean of Harvard Law School, from 1895 to 1910
Bemis Professor of International Law – The first of the professorial positions at Harvard Law School, it was endowed in the will of  George Bemis,  American lawyer, legal scholar and advocate of international law
Louis D. Brandeis Professor of Law
Bruce Bromley Professor of Law
Bussey Professor of Law
Byrne Professor of Administrative Law
Carter Professor of General Jurisprudence
Jesse Climenko Professor of Law 
John F. Cogan, Jr., Professor of Law
The Custodian of the Two Holy Mosques Assistant Professor of Islamic Legal Studies. 
Felix Frankfurter Professor of Law
Paul A. Freund Professor of Law
Henry J. Friendly Professor of Law
Fessenden Professor of Law
William J. Friedman & Alicia Townsend Friedman Professor of Law, Economics and Finance
Eli Goldston Professor of Law
Leo Gottlieb Professor of Law 
John L. Gray Professor of Law 
Hieken Professor of Patent Law
Louis A. Horvitz Professor of Law
Manley Hudson Professor of Law 
Kirkland & Ellis Professor of Law 
Langdell Professor of Law
Learned Hand Professor of Law
Carl M. Loeb University Professor
Mitsubishi Professor of Japanese Legal Studies 
Nomura Professor of International Financial Systems
William Nelson Cromwell Professor of Law
Roscoe Pound Professor of Law
Ezra Ripley Thayer Professor of Law
Ropes & Gray Professor of Law. 
Samuel R. Rosenthal Professor of Law
Royall Professor of Law
Henry Shattuck Professor of Law 
J. Sinclair Armstrong Professor of International, Foreign and Comparative Law 
Jeremiah Smith, Jr., Professor of Law
Charles Stebbins Fairchild Professor of Law. 
Henry L. Stimson Professor of Law
Story Professor of Law  
Stanley S. Surrey Professor of Law
Touroff-Glueck Professor in Criminal Justice
Ralph S. Tyler, Jr. Professor of Constitutional Law
Robert Walmsley University Professor
Austin Wakeman Scott Professor of Law
Charles Warren Professor of American Legal History
Morris Wasserstein Public Interest Professor of Law
John H. Watson, Jr., Professor of Law
Weld Professor of Law
Paul W. Williams Professor of Criminal Justice
Samuel Williston Professor of Law

Harvard Law School

Professorships in law